Statistics of Campeonato da 1ª Divisão do Futebol in the 2002 season.

Overview
Monte Carlo won the championship.

League standings

References
RSSSF

Campeonato da 1ª Divisão do Futebol seasons
Macau
Macau
1